Clavus lamberti is a species of sea snail, a marine gastropod mollusk in the family Drilliidae.

Description
The size of an adult shell varies between 8 mm and 20 mm. The shell is yellowish brown, with a central reddish chestnut band, filled with a double series of revolving white-tipped tubercles. Below this, on the body whorl, there is a second narrower band, bearing a single series of small white tubercles, a brown line and spots at the base.

Distribution
This species occurs in the demersal zone of the tropical Indo-Pacific off East Africa, the Philippines, Papua New Guinea, Australia (Northern Territory, Queensland, Western Australia), New Caledonia, and Polynesia.

References

 Montrouzier, R.P. 1859. Descriptions d'espèces nouvelle de l'Archipel Calédonien. Journal de Conchyliologie 7(2): 373–375 
 Kobelt, W. 1886. Das Genus Pleurotoma. pp. 173–184 in Küster, H.C., Martini, F.W. & Chemnitz, J.H. (eds). Systematisches Conchylien Cabinet. Die Familie Pleurotomidae. Nürnberg : Bauer & Raspe Vol. 4. 
 Bouge, L.J. & Dautzenberg, P.L. 1914. Les Pleurotomides de la Nouvelle-Caledonie et de ses dependances. Journal de Conchyliologie 61: 123–214
 Habe, T. 1964. Shells of the Western Pacific in color. Osaka : Hoikusha Vol. 2 233 pp., 66 pls. 
 Maes, V.O. 1967. The littoral marine mollusks of Cocos-Keeling Islands (Indian Ocean). Proceedings of the Academy of Natural Sciences, Philadelphia 119: 93–217 
 Cernohorsky, W.O. 1978. Tropical Pacific Marine Shells. Sydney : Pacific Publications 352 pp., 68 pls. 
 Wells F.E. (1991) A revision of the Recent Australian species of the turrid genera Clavus, Plagiostropha, and Tylotiella (Mollusca: Gastropoda). Journal of the Malacological Society of Australia 12: 1–33
 Rosenberg, G. 1992. Encyclopedia of Seashells. Dorset: New York. 224 pp. page(s): 107 
 Wilson, B. 1994. Australian Marine Shells. Prosobranch Gastropods. Kallaroo, WA : Odyssey Publishing Vol. 2 370 pp. 
 Tucker, J.K. 2004 Catalog of recent and fossil turrids (Mollusca: Gastropoda). Zootaxa 682:1–1295

External links
 

lamberti
Gastropods described in 1860